Lamphey railway station is on the Pembroke Dock branch of the West Wales Line, managed by Transport for Wales Rail.

References

External links 

Railway stations in Pembrokeshire
DfT Category F2 stations
Former Great Western Railway stations
Railway stations in Great Britain opened in 1863
Railway stations served by Great Western Railway
Railway stations served by Transport for Wales Rail
Railway request stops in Great Britain